Claude Gewerc (born 21 June 1947 in Bergen-Belsen, Germany) is a retired British-born French politician, and former President of the regional council of Picardy.

In March 1998, he was elected to the Regional Council of Picardy to represent the Oise, and was leader of the Socialist group in the regional council from 1998 to 2004, at which date he defeated the incumbent UDF administration to become Regional president. From 2001 to 2004, he served as Mayor of Clermont, Oise.

In December 2015, Gewerc left the Socialist Party. Since then, he has not been involved in politics.

References 

1947 births
Living people
Presidents of the Regional Council of Picardy
Jewish French politicians
People from Celle (district)
Socialist Party (France) politicians